The US Quidditch Cup 10 was the 2017 edition of the US Quidditch Cup, a quidditch club tournament organized by US Quidditch. The tournament took place in Kissimmee, Florida from April 8–9, 2017.

The Cup featured 60 teams that qualified through eight regional championships. Each region was assigned bids according to the Huntington–Hill method, and 16 bids were assigned to regions according to their US Quidditch Cup 9 performance.

Format
The 60 teams that qualified were divided into 12 pools of five teams each. Following pool play, the top three teams of each pool advanced to a 36-team single elimination bracket.

Bracket phase
* Denotes a regulation-time snitch snatch.

^ Denotes an overtime snitch snatch.

References

External links
US Quidditch Cup
US Quidditch

2017 in sports in Florida
US Quidditch Cup
2017 in American sports
Sports in Kissimmee, Florida
Sports competitions in Florida
April 2017 sports events in the United States